Kubay Quaiyan (born July 10, 1982) is a Liberian footballer, he plays as a defender.

References

External links
Profile at liga-indonesia.co.id

1982 births
Living people
Liberian footballers
Association football defenders
Expatriate footballers in Indonesia
Liberian expatriate sportspeople in Indonesia
Liberian expatriate footballers
Liga 1 (Indonesia) players
Persiram Raja Ampat players
Semen Padang F.C. players
PSSB Bireuen players